"Begging" is a 2013 song by Swedish singer Anton Ewald. The song was released on February 22, 2013, as the lead single from his debut extended play, A. Written by  Fredrik Kempe and Anton Malmberg Hård af Segerstad, it was performed in Melodifestivalen 2013 in the second semi-final was held on 9 February 2013 in Scandinavium, Gothenburg. Finishing 3rd/4th, it went on to the Second Chance round, where it passed through to the Melodifestivalen final after a duel with Behrang Miri and his song "Jalla Dansa Sawa". In the finals, it finished at fourth place, failing to qualify to 2013 Eurovision Song Contest.

Despite the result at the contest, the song gained popularity with the Swedish public and the single was released immediately after the competition. It subsequently peaked at number two on the Swedish Singles Chart.

Charts

Weekly charts

Year-end charts

References

Melodifestivalen songs of 2013
Songs written by Fredrik Kempe
Songs written by Anton Hård af Segerstad
2013 songs